Garry Mendes Rodrigues (born 27 November 1990) is a professional footballer who plays as a winger for Greek Super League club Olympiacos and the Cape Verde national team. Born in the Netherlands, he represents the Cape Verde national team.

In February 2013, Rodrigues announced that he would like to represent Cape Verde, and made his debut in August 2013. He represented the side at the 2015 and 2021 Africa Cup of Nations.

He formerly played for PAOK, Elche CF, XerxesDZB, FC Boshuizen, ADO Den Haag, Dordrecht, Levski Sofia and Galatasaray.

He is a cousin of Jerson Cabral.

Career
As a youth player Rodrigues played for Feyenoord and Portuguese Real Sport Clube.

Rodrigues joined Eredivisie club ADO Den Haag from amateur FC Boshuizen on 16 May 2012, signing a 1+1 years contract. In July, he was loaned out to Eerste Divisie club Dordrecht. Rodrigues made his league debut in a 1–1 away draw against Emmen on 10 August, playing the full 90 minutes.

Levski Sofia
On 11 February 2013, Rodrigues signed a two-and-a-half-year contract with Bulgarian club Levski Sofia. He made his debut away at Chernomorets Burgas in a 2–0 win on 3 March. On 13 March, he scored his first goal for Levski in the 22nd minute of a Bulgarian Cup quarter-final first leg tie against Litex Lovech. On 20 April, in a 2–1 away victory over Litex, Rodrigues netted his first league goal and assisted Hristo Yovov.

On 21 July 2013, Rodrigues opened the scoring in Levski's first match of the 2013–14 A PFG season against Botev Plovdiv, but was subsequently sent off after an altercation with Veselin Minev.

During the first half of the 2013–14 season Rodrigues scored 14 goals in total helping Levski Sofia to overcome several teams and progress to the 3rd place in the league ranking. He also scored a penalty in the 7–6 win after penalties against CSKA Sofia in a Bulgarian Cup Eternal Derby third round tie, eventually helping the team to reach the quarter-finals of the competition. The strong overall performance led to the interest of several European clubs. In January 2014, West Ham United sent an offer to Levski for a trial, but Rodrigues refused it, stating that he would only negotiate with a team which is guaranteed to offer him a contract.

Elche
On 27 January 2014, Rodrigues signed with Elche CF on a six-month loan through Promoesport (an investment fund linked to Gimnàstic de Tarragona), with a buyout clause. He made his La Liga debut on 1 March, coming on as a second-half substitute in the 1–0 home win over Celta de Vigo, and scored his first goal in the category on 3 May, netting the game's only in an away success against Málaga CF.

In the 2014 summer Rodrigues signed a four-year deal with the Valencian club, after his buyout clause was activated. On 31 July 2015 he rescinded his link.

PAOK
On 4 August 2015, Rodrigues signed a three years' contract with PAOK for an undisclosed fee. On 23 September 2015, in a home derby game against AEK Athens he scored his first goal in Greek Super League. On 11 January 2016, PAOK turned down Al-Ahli Saudi FC's offer in the region of €1.7 million for Garry Rodrigues. He finished the season with 7 goals being the third scorer of the club.
On 24 November 2016 in UEFA Europa League group stage away match against ACF Fiorentina in the dying seconds Rodrigues storms downfield, cuts in from the left and fires into the roof of the net, giving his club an incredible 3–2 win.

Galatasaray
On 9 January 2017, PAOK officially announced the transfer of Garry Rodrigues to Galatasaray for a fee of €3.7m. The transfer has been announced, thanks to the contribution of the 27-year-old player for so long. In February 2018, Galatasaray's Cape Verde winger Garry Rodrigues has emerged as a transfer target for Olympique Lyon. The 27-year-old Blue Sharks star has racked up five goals and eight assists in 22 Super Lig appearances since the start of the 2017–18 season. The attacker is value at around €16 million and Lyon may face competition from the likes of Sevilla and Fiorentina for his signature.
He is finally contracted to Galatasaray until the summer of 2021.

Al-Ittihad
On 6 January 2019, Rodrigues joined Al-Ittihad of Saudi Arabia for a fee of €9m.

Fenerbahçe
On 13 July 2019, Fenerbahçe announced the signing of Rodrigues on loan for 2 years from Al-Ittihad.

Olympiacos
On 18 September 2021, Olympiacos F.C. officially announced the signing of Rodrigues signing a three years' contract with €1 million annual fee, including bonuses.

International career
Rodrigues received his first international call-up in August 2013 to play friendly match against Gabon on the 14th of that month. He substituted Djaniny at halftime. On 30 December 2013, Rodrigues appeared as a starter in the 1–4 loss against Catalonia in a friendly match, assisting his team's goal that was scored by Djaniny. On 6 September 2014 he scored his first international goal in a 3–1 away win over Niger in Cape Verde's successful qualification for the 2015 Africa Cup of Nations. Rodrigues was included in their squad for the finals in Equatorial Guinea, but due to competition from Kuca, Djaniny and Júlio Tavares he played only in the goalless draw with Zambia, which confirmed their elimination from Group B.

Career statistics

International
Scores and results list Cape Verde's goal tally first.

Honours

Club
Levski Sofia
Bulgarian Cup runner-up: 2012–13

Galatasaray 
Süper Lig: 2017–18

Olympiacos
Super League Greece: 2021–22

Individual
Super League Greece Team of the Year: 2015–16
Süper Lig Team of the Year: 2017–18

References

External links

1990 births
Living people
Association football wingers
Footballers from Rotterdam
Dutch footballers
Dutch sportspeople of Cape Verdean descent
Dutch expatriate sportspeople in Spain
Cape Verdean footballers
Cape Verde international footballers
Cape Verdean expatriate footballers
Cape Verdean expatriate sportspeople in Spain
ADO Den Haag players
FC Dordrecht players
PFC Levski Sofia players
Elche CF players
PAOK FC players
Galatasaray S.K. footballers
Ittihad FC players
Fenerbahçe S.K. footballers
Eerste Divisie players
First Professional Football League (Bulgaria) players
La Liga players
Super League Greece players
Süper Lig players
Saudi Professional League players
Expatriate footballers in the Netherlands
Expatriate footballers in Bulgaria
Expatriate footballers in Spain
Expatriate footballers in Greece
Expatriate footballers in Turkey
Expatriate footballers in Saudi Arabia
Cape Verdean expatriate sportspeople in Bulgaria
Cape Verdean expatriate sportspeople in Turkey
Cape Verdean expatriate sportspeople in Saudi Arabia
Cape Verdean expatriate sportspeople in Greece
2015 Africa Cup of Nations players
2021 Africa Cup of Nations players